Plasmodium joyeuxi is a parasite of the genus Plasmodium subgenus Vinckeia. As in Plasmodium species, P. joyeuxi has both vertebrate and insect hosts. The vertebrate hosts for this parasite are mammals.

Taxonomy 
The parasite was first described by Ledger in 1928.

Hosts 
The only known host for this species is the monkey Cercopithecis callitricus.

References 

joyeuxi